Forest Grove may refer to:

Australia
 Forest Grove, Western Australia, locality in the Shire of Augusta-Margaret River

Canada
 Forest Grove, Saskatoon, a neighborhood of Saskatoon, Saskatchewan

United States
Forest Grove, Minnesota, an unincorporated community near International Falls, Minnesota
Forest Grove, Montana, an unincorporated community in Fergus County
Forest Grove, Oregon, a city near Portland, Oregon
Forest Grove, Texas, an unincorporated community in Collin County, Texas
Forest Grove Historic District, Buckingham, Pennsylvania, listed on the NRHP in Pennsylvania